Admiral of the Blue Sir Alexander Inglis Cochrane  (born Alexander Forrester Cochrane; 23 April 1758 – 26 January 1832) was a senior Royal Navy commander during the Napoleonic Wars and achieved the rank of admiral.

He had previously captained HMS Ajax in Alexandria, Egypt during the Egyptian operation of 1801. Cochrane was knighted into the Order of the Bath for his services in 1806. In 1814 he became vice admiral and commander-in-chief of the North American Station, led the naval forces during the attacks on Washington and New Orleans, and was promoted to admiral in 1819 and became commander-in-chief of the Plymouth naval base.

Naval career 
Alexander Inglis Cochrane was a younger son of the Scottish peer Thomas Cochrane, the eighth Earl of Dundonald, and his second wife, Jane Stuart. He joined the Royal Navy as a boy and served with British naval forces in North America. He served during the American War of Independence.

Cochrane also participated in the Egyptian operations in 1801.

About 1802-1803 Cochrane alienated the Spanish governor of Ferrol, Galicia when one of his commanders intercepted four ships of the Spanish treasure fleet returning from South America, before they reached Cádiz. The effect of Cochrane's actions was to bring Spain back into the war on France's side in 1804.

Cochrane also had been incensed that the brilliant Sir Edward Pellew, a "tarpaulin officer" (an officer who had worked up from being a seaman), had been preferred over himself, a well connected aristocrat, as Admiral of the White to become Commander-in-Chief, East Indies. Cochrane tried to implicate Sir Edward Pellew, who had good relations with the Governor of Ferrol, in fraud, then making seriously damaging and unfounded allegations against Sir Edward Pellew's secretary Fitzgerald. These were never substantiated and destroyed Fitzgerald's career but didn't accomplish the destruction of its target, who later became Viscount Exmouth.

In the Caribbean
In 1805 Cochrane was made commander of the Leeward Islands Station. He conducted operations against the French and Spanish on 6 February 1806 at the Battle of San Domingo during the Napoleonic Wars. A cannonball blew his hat off his head while he was on the deck of his flagship, . He was appointed Knight Commander of the Order of the Bath on 29 March 1806 in recognition of his service. Other rewards included thanks from both Houses of Parliament, freedom of the city of London, and a sword valued at 100 guineas.

In Barbados, Cochrane met with General Francisco de Miranda, who had been defeated by Spanish naval forces in an attempt to liberate Venezuela. As Spain was then at war with Britain, Cochrane and the governor of Trinidad agreed to provide some support for an unsuccessful second attempt to invade Venezuela.

In 1809 he commanded naval forces in the conquest of Martinique. On 25 October 1809 he was promoted to the rank of Vice Admiral. He held the position of Governor of Guadeloupe from 6 February 1810 to 26 June 1813.

"No individual had greater responsibility for the decision to recruit and arm American slaves than did Alexander Cochrane." Cochrane formed two Corps of Colonial Marines, made up primarily of escaped slaves.  The first corps was based on the island of Marie-Galante and operated from 1808 to 1810. The larger second corps (the first had been disbanded), formed in 1814, was disbanded in 1815, at the conclusion of the War of 1812.

War of 1812

From April 1814, during the War of 1812 against the United States, Cochrane, then a vice admiral, served as commander-in-chief of both the North American Station, based at the new dockyard in Bermuda, and the Jamaica Station, based at Port Royal. He landed the force under Major-General Robert Ross that burned Washington and pushed successful naval forays at the same time. Initially he wanted to attack Rhode Island in New England after the success at Washington, but he was dissuaded by Ross and Rear Admiral George Cockburn, who wanted to go after the bigger prize of Baltimore, Maryland.

Cochrane was appointed the Commander-in-Chief, North American Station (1814-1815). His correspondence log commences with mention of the correspondence dated 27 December 1813 from the Admiralty which formally appointed him as successor to Sir John Warren.

Cochrane approved the plan proposed by Rear Admiral Sir George Cockburn, 10th Baronet to attack Washington, after the latter predicted that "within a short period of time, with enough force, we could easily have at our mercy the capital". The 4,500 troops, commanded by Major General Robert Ross, successfully captured the capital city on 24 August 1814; Ross then directed the Burning of Washington but refused suggestions by both Cochrane and Cockburn to raze the city. Ross ordered his troops to cause no damage to private property.

It was aboard Cochrane’s flagship, HMS Tonnant, near the mouth of the Potomac on September 7, 1814 that Francis Scott Key and Colonel John Skinner pleaded for and got the release of Doctor William Beanes, a civilian who had been taken prisoner in Upper Marlboro after withdrawing from the assault on Washington.
The next day Key, Skinner and Beanes were transferred to the frigate HMS Surprise, with their truce vessel in tow, as the fleet slowly moved up the Chesapeake toward Baltimore. They would not be released until the assault on Baltimore was completed. On September 11 Skinner insisted they be put back on their own truce vessel which they were allowed to do, under guard. 

The morning of the 12th, 4500 British troops landed on the North Point peninsula and started marching toward Baltimore. Major General Robert Ross was killed by sniper fire in a skirmish that afternoon before the Battle of North Point. 

Cochrane transferred his flag to HMS Surprise to facilitate moving up the Patapsco River to direct the 25 hour bombardment of Fort McHenry outside Baltimore (September 13 and 14), which proved ineffectual. He resisted calls by his junior officers to attack the fort more aggressively with frigates at close range. He ordered a diversionary raid by boats, around 1am on the 14th, to assist the army encamped near Baltimore in their proposed attack on Hampstead Hill (which they cancelled and withdrew), but this diversion had no success. In the bombardment of Fort McHenry, Cochrane's fleet used bomb vessels and a rocket ship for a long-range bombardment to minimize casualties and damage to the fleet from the fort's return fire, which inspired Francis Scott Key's poem that became "The Star-Spangled Banner", the US national anthem. 

Cochrane led the British force that won the Battle of Lake Borgne, in Louisiana, in December 1814 and also controlled the soldiers and marines on ships during the Battle of New Orleans. His forces built a hard short road to New Orleans for use by British armed forces. The British army was defeated at the Battle of New Orleans on 8 January 1815 and Cochrane received some criticism for his role in that loss, which prevented the British from gaining a foothold in the US.

One source explains that, at New Orleans, "naval support continued to be a problem, however, and though the British force led by Colonel William Thornton was able to take control of the artillery, they arrived too late. By the time the Royal Navy delivered Thornton’s troops, the battle was already lost". Cochrane subsequently filed two reports with his own version of the battle where he controlled an armada with 8,000 men. The American Naval History and Heritage Command does not lay blame on any individual in the British forces, but concludes that the "British then made a tactical error. Rather than pressing forward, they were allowed time to rest". This source also mentions that forces from the ships finally decided to attack with 1,200 British sailors and marines, but "after 36 hours of rowing, the invaders faced a hail of grape shot". 

The Duke of Wellington was particularly vociferous in his criticism. He claimed that the failure of the New Orleans campaign was  In a eulogy to General Edward Pakenham (Wellington's brother-in-law, killed at New Orleans), he said:
I cannot but regret that he was ever employed on such a service or with such a colleague. The expedition to New Orleans originated with that colleague ... The Americans were prepared with an army in a fortified position which still would have been carried, if the duties of others, that is of the Admiral (Sir Alexander Cochrane), had been as well performed as that of he whom we now lament.

In spite of bearing some responsibility for the loss at New Orleans, Cochrane was later promoted to Admiral of the Blue in 1819. From 1821 to 1824, he was Commander-in-Chief, Plymouth. He died in Paris on 26 January 1832.

Political career 
Cochrane was a Member of Parliament (MP) for Stirling Burghs from 1800 to 1802, and from 1803 to 1806.

Family 
In 1788, he married Maria Shaw; they had three sons and two daughters. His son Thomas John Cochrane was entered in the Royal Navy at the age of seven; he rose to become governor of the colony of Newfoundland, and Admiral of the Fleet; he was appointed Knight of the Order of the Bath.

Alexander Cochrane was the sixth of the surviving sons of Thomas Cochrane, 8th Earl of Dundonald. The eldest son Archibald Cochrane became the earl and lost the family lands on a series of inventions and investments. Many of the younger sons served in the military or had careers supplying it. The next brother, Charles, served in the army and was killed at the Siege of Yorktown; he had married to Catherine, the daughter of Major John Pitcairn. The third surviving son, John Cochrane, was a paymaster and provisioner to the army and navy. His children included Nathaniel Day Cochrane, who became a rear admiral, and probably the chess player John Cochrane. The next son, Basil Cochrane, made a fortune supplying the Royal Navy in India. Alexander was the sixth son. The seventh, George Augustus Frederick Cochrane, had an army career and served in Parliament. The youngest son, Andrew Cochrane-Johnstone, was an army officer, colonial governor, politician, and fraudster.

The Earl of St. Vincent wrote of the Cochrane brothers in 1806, "The Cochranes are not to be trusted out of sight, they are all mad, romantic, money-getting and not truth-telling—and there is not a single exception in any part of the family."

Legacy 
 Namesake of Admiral Rock, Nova Scotia

References

Bibliography 

 Anderson, William. (1862). The Scottish Nation: Or The Surnames, Families, Literature, Honours, and Biographical History of the People of Scotland. Fullarton.

External links 
Significant Scots: Sir Alexander Cochrane – Biography from ElectricScotland.com

|-

|-

|-

|-

1758 births
1832 deaths
Royal Navy admirals
Scottish sailors
Royal Navy personnel of the War of 1812
Royal Navy personnel of the Napoleonic Wars
Scottish Episcopalians
Knights Grand Cross of the Order of the Bath
Younger sons of earls
History of Îles des Saintes
Burials at Père Lachaise Cemetery
Alexander
Members of the Parliament of Great Britain for Scottish constituencies
Members of the Parliament of the United Kingdom for Stirling constituencies
British MPs 1796–1800
UK MPs 1801–1802
UK MPs 1802–1806